Spiros Antoniou (Greek: Σπύρος Αντωνίου; born 24 October 1973 in Athens, Greece) is a Greek death metal singer, bassist, and visual artist best known for his work with Greek symphonic death metal band Septicflesh, in which he has been since 1990 foundation and of which he is a founding member. He has also contributed to bands such as TheDevilWorx, Chaostar, and Thou Art Lord.

Antoniou is also a visual artist under the pseudonym Seth Siro Anton. He made the cover art for almost every Septicflesh release (including re-issues), as well as several cover paintings for other bands such as: Decapitated, Devian, Vader, Paradise Lost, Belphegor, Nile, Soilwork, Caliban, Heaven Shall Burn, Serenity, Kamelot, Flowing Tears, Moonspell, Methedras, Universum, The Foreshadowing, and Old Man's Child.

References

External links

Official site

Death metal musicians
1973 births
Living people
Singers from Athens
Artists from Athens
Album-cover and concert-poster artists